The Singles: The First Ten Years is a double compilation album by Swedish pop group ABBA, released in November 1982.

History
The album contained most of the band's hit singles from their ten years together as recording artists, and included two new tracks: "The Day Before You Came" and "Under Attack". The Singles: The First Ten Years was released on CD in Canada only by Atlantic Records in 1987, but was quickly deleted in 1988 when Atlantic's rights to the catalog expired. In 2001, the album was replaced by The Definitive Collection. In the Spin Alternative Record Guide (1995), the compilation was ranked 80th on the book's list of the "Top 100 Alternative Albums".

Richard Cook in the New Musical Express described the collection as a "documentation of the group who altered the course of pop more than anyone else. It resulted in a seam of unbroken, highly individual pop music that in lifespan terms is still unmatched."

Track listing
All songs written by Benny Andersson and Björn Ulvaeus, except where noted. It was released as a 2 LP and double cassette. In 1983 a two CD version of the collection appeared on Polydor records, produced in West Germany.

LP1
"Ring Ring" – 3:04
"Waterloo" - 2:42
"So Long" – 3:05
"I Do, I Do, I Do, I Do, I Do" – 3:16
"SOS" – 3:22
"Mamma Mia" – 3:31
"Fernando" – 4:12
"Dancing Queen" – 3:50
"Money, Money, Money" – 3:06
"Knowing Me, Knowing You" – 4:02
"The Name of the Game" – 4:53
"Take a Chance on Me" – 4:06
"Summer Night City" – 3:34

LP2
"Chiquitita" – 5:26
"Does Your Mother Know" – 3:14
"Voulez-Vous" – 5:08
"Gimme! Gimme! Gimme! (A Man After Midnight)" – 4:49
"I Have a Dream" – 4:44
"The Winner Takes It All" – 4:55
"Super Trouper" – 4:13
"One of Us" – 3:55
"The Day Before You Came" – 5:50
"Under Attack" – 3:47

Personnel
ABBA
Agnetha Fältskog – lead vocals , co-lead vocals , backing vocals
Anni-Frid Lyngstad – lead vocals , co-lead vocals , backing vocals
Björn Ulvaeus – steel-string, acoustic guitar, lead vocals , backing vocals
Benny Andersson – synthesizer, keyboards, backing vocals

Additional personnel
Ulf Andersson – saxophone
Ola Brunkert – drums
Lars Carlsson – horn
Christer Eklund – saxophone
Malando Gassama – percussion
Anders Glenmark – guitar
Rutger Gunnarsson – bass
Roger Palm – drums
Janne Schaffer – guitar
Åke Sundqvist – percussion
Mike Watson – bass
Lasse Wellander – guitar

Production
Benny Andersson – producer, arranger
Björn Ulvaeus – producer, arranger
Michael Tretow – engineer

Charts

Weekly charts

Year-end charts

Certifications

References

Singles: First Ten Years, The
Singles: First Ten Years, The
Singles: First Ten Years, The
Atlantic Records compilation albums
Epic Records compilation albums
Albums recorded at Polar Studios
Albums produced by Björn Ulvaeus
Albums produced by Benny Andersson